Tiger is an extinct town in Summit County, in the U.S. state of Colorado.

A post office called Tiger was established in 1919, and remained in operation until 1940. The community took its name from the Royal Tiger Mines Company. The town site was destroyed before 1995 by the Forest Service in order to be used as a snowmobile track.

References

Ghost towns in Colorado
Former populated places in Summit County, Colorado
Geography of Summit County, Colorado